Joseph C. Brown (died 1849) was an American surveyor in the United States who made several major surveys in the Louisiana Territory.

Among his notable surveys:
Initial point of the Fifth Principal Meridian (1815) - Brown established the initial point of the Fifth Principal Meridian which was to be used for surveying lands in the Louisiana Purchase in the states of Arkansas, Missouri, Iowa, Minnesota, South Dakota and North Dakota.  Brown established the baseline on October 27, 1815 at the mouth of the Mississippi River.  Prospect Robbins surveyed north from the mouth of the Arkansas River on the Mississippi.  Where the two lines met was the Initial Point which is in Louisiana Purchase State Park in Arkansas.
First plat of St. Louis, Missouri (1815-1818) - Brown's starting point in the survey was the home of Auguste Chouteau
Indian Territory Line between Missouri and Indian Territory (1823), present day Kansas - Brown surveys the line south from its origin at the confluence of the Kansas River and Missouri River and then surveys the Missouri-Arkansas line.  Virtually all Native Americans south of the Iowa line were to be moved west of line.
Santa Fe Trail (1825)
Honey War line (1836) Brown's most controversial survey was the resurvey of the Sullivan Line, which caused Missouri to claim its border extended 13 miles into Iowa.  When Missouri tax collectors attempted to collect revenue from the new territory they were run out of the state. In the process they cut down three trees with honey bee hives for partial payment.  The source of the debate was the definition of the Des Moines Rapids.  When Missouri entered the Union in 1820 it said its border extended from the rapids on the River Des Moines.  Brown couldn't find the rapids at the said intersection with the river-and hence-said the rapids were further north.  The Supreme Court was to repudiate what was called "Brown's Line" and uphold the Sullivan Line as the border (although resurveyed).

In addition to his surveying duties he was a sheriff of St. Louis County, Missouri as well as county engineer.

References

Year of birth missing
People from St. Louis
1849 deaths
American surveyors